The ABC Champions Cup 1997 was the 8th staging of the ABC Champions Cup, the basketball club tournament of Asian Basketball Confederation. The tournament was held in Jakarta, Indonesia between July 18 and July 25, 1997.

Preliminary round

Group A

Group B

Classification 5th–10th

9th place

7th place

5th place

Final round

Semifinals

3rd place

Final

Final standing

Awards
Most Valuable Player:  Wayman Strickland (Regal)

References
FIBA Asia

1997
Champions Cup
B
Basketball Asia Champions Cup 1997